Pennybridge Pioneers is the fourth album by Swedish punk rock band Millencolin, released on 22 February 2000 by Epitaph Records. The album was their first album to move away from their ska punk elements in favor of a more alternative rock sound. It was also the band's first album recorded outside their native country of Sweden, and their first to be certified gold in sales after selling over 35,000 copies in Australia.

Its title is derived from the band's home town of Örebro, which jocularly translates to "Pennybridge" in English. "Fox" and "Penguins & Polarbears" were released as singles with accompanying music videos. "No Cigar" was also released as a single and EP and appeared in the soundtracks of the video games Tony Hawk's Pro Skater 2, Jeremy McGrath Supercross World, Tony Hawk's Pro Skater HD and Tony Hawk's Pro Skater 1 + 2. "Pepper"  was also included in the soundtrack album Music from and Inspired by Tony Hawk's Pro Skater 3, though it was not included in the game itself.

Production
Pennybridge Pioneers was recorded at Westbeach Recorders in Hollywood, California, with producer Brett Gurewitz. Sessions lasted from 28 July to 6 September 1999. Gurewitz and Donell acted as engineers; they were assisted by Jay Gordon. Eddie Schreyer mastered the album at Oasis Mastering.

Release
On 3 November 1999, Pennybridge Pioneers was announced for release in February 2000. "Material Boy" was posted online on 10 November 1999. Pennybridge Pioneers was eventually released on 22 February 2000. Following this, the band appeared on Warped Tour, and the Epitaph Punkorama Tour. The band supported the Offspring on their west coast US tour in July and August 2001. While the band was initially scheduled to appear at Edgefest II in Canada, they instead played two shows with Blink-182.

To coincide with the 10th anniversary of the album, the band initially performed it in its entirety for a Canadian tour in September 2010, and then a South America tour in November 2010.

Reception

Pennybridge Pioneers was met with generally favorable reviews from music critics. It was certified platinum in Australia in May 2001.

Track listing
All songs by Nikola Sarcevic, except where noted. All lyrics by Sarcevic.

Personnel
Personnel per booklet.

Millencolin
 Erik Ohlsson – guitar, backing vocals
 Mathias Färm – guitar, backing vocals
 Fredrik Larzon – drums, backing vocals
 Nikola Sarcevic – lead vocals, bass guitar, backing vocals, acoustic guitar (track 14)

Additional musicians
 Brett Gurewitz – backing vocals, guitar solo (track 11), piano (track 14), guitar (track 14)

Production and design
 Brett Gurewitz – producer, engineer
 Donell Cameron – engineer
 Eddie Schreyer – mastering
 Jay Gordon – assistant engineer
 Erik Ohlsson – oil painting, art, layout, single photo
 Magnus Sundholm – band photo
 Greg Truex – single photo
 Tive – single photo
 Petter Koubeck – single photo

References

External links

Pennybridge Pioneers at YouTube (streamed copy where licensed)

Millencolin albums
2000 albums
Burning Heart Records albums
Epitaph Records albums